Chorlu may refer to:
 Çorlu, Turkey
 Lernantsk, Armenia, formerly Chorlu